Gomusin are shoes made of rubber in a form of Korean traditional shoes. The shoes are wide, with low heels. Gomusin for men were modeled after "gatsin" (갖신), and ones for women were danghye (당혜). Gomusin first appeared in the early 20th century. They were much easier to keep clean than danghye and jipsin (straw shoes) and they could be worn when it rains. Therefore, gomusin gained a popularity and replaced traditional shoes.

History 
It is purported that the first man to wear gomusin was Sunjong of Korea, the last emperor of Joseon. From 1938 to 1945, the Japanese colonial régime restricted the wearing of national dress including gomusin. From 1945 to the end of the Korean War the now legalized shoes became very popular. After 1960, while the manufacture of gomusin became more sophisticated and more appealing styles were able to proliferate, gomusin became less common in everyday dress.

Gomusins are made by mixing rubber, leather, and cloth. This is likely the cause of their decline in popularity: they are relatively heavy and unergonomic, making them uncomfortable to wear for extended periods of time.

See also
Gomsin
Hwa
Jipsin
Hanbok
List of Korean clothing
Black Rubber Shoes

References

Korean footwear